Rouhollah Arab (born February 1, 1984) is an Iranian footballer who plays as a striker for Aluminium Arak in the Azadegan League.

Club career

Club Career Statistics
Last Update: 10 May 2013 

Assists

Honours

Club
Azadegan League
Runner up: 1
2009–10 with Sanat Naft

References

External links
 Arab's Interview at Navad
 Rouhollah Arab at Persian League
 

1984 births
Living people
Sportspeople from Sari, Iran
Iranian footballers
Nassaji Mazandaran players
Sanat Naft Abadan F.C. players
Zob Ahan Esfahan F.C. players
Malavan players
Persian Gulf Pro League players
Azadegan League players
Association football forwards